Life in Action is a book by Fernando Espuelas, published by Penguin Books in 2004, as an auto-biographical and philosophical story using Espuelas' experiences from childhood in Uruguay, through his early years in the United States, to the founding of Starmedia, the first Latin portal  and VOY, as a real-life context for his personal philosophy of self-actualization.

Background
In his book, Life in Action, Espuelas posits that introspection and subsequent analysis serve as the driving force behind action. He succinctly summarizes these ideas with the Spanish word "voy" ("I go"). Furthermore, Life in Action explores the concept of visualizing success and striving towards it on a daily basis. Espuelas' twelve principles are inspired by the lives of historical figures such as Winston Churchill, Mahatma Gandhi, Martin Luther King Jr., and Nelson Mandela, as well as his own experiences.

Fernando Espuelas is a co-founder of the pioneering Latin American online company StarMedia. He has been recognized for his work with numerous awards, including being named one of Time and CNN's "Leaders of the Millennium" and a "2000 All-Star" business leader by Crain's New York Business magazine. The World Economic Forum has included him among its "Global Leaders of Tomorrow,"  and he has been recognized by various media outlets as a powerful and influential figure. In 2008, he created a bilingual talk show that is broadcast on the Univision Radio Network  and online at espuelas.com. He is also a frequent commentator in television and print media.

References 

2004 non-fiction books
American memoirs